The Jacob Wingard Dreher House, also known as Glencoe Farm, is an historic home located near Irmo, Lexington County, South Carolina. It was built about 1830–50, and is a two-story, rectangular weatherboarded frame farmhouse. It has a gable roof and features a one-story, shed-roofed porch across the front façade.  A single story wing, added about 1910, is connected to the left elevation by a porch. Also on the property is a one-story, frame, weatherboarded store building, which was moved to its present location about 1945.

It was listed on the National Register of Historic Places in 1983.

References 

Houses on the National Register of Historic Places in South Carolina
Houses completed in 1850
Houses in Lexington County, South Carolina
National Register of Historic Places in Lexington County, South Carolina